A Cañiza is a municipality in Galicia, Spain in the province of Pontevedra with an area of 108.1 km² and a population approaching 5,200 inhabitants in 2018 distributed across 9 parishes. A Cañiza is part of the comarca of A Paradanta.

This category of village municipality, known for its excellent tourism and the strong momentum that is experiencing the industrial and business sector.

The exquisite and rich local cuisine, from meat products with ham as a champion and holding important events, such as the ancient pilgrimages A Franqueira, declared by the Autonomous Community of Galicia Tourist Interest Party, or the known Ham Fair, are some of the tourist attractions .

This mid-mountain location and interior provides the opportunity to see a marked diversity caused by the uneven landscape of mountains and valleys and to know its artistic heritage, the customs of the people and enjoy the many popular events that take place throughout the year. The tourist offer is complete with services designed to improve the quality of life of its inhabitants and, at the same time, to meet the needs and demands of travelers who daily visit to Cañiza .

History 

Despite being the newest of the parishes which constitute the Municipal, if we consider its founding year, A Cañiza is today the most important of the nine that make up the town, to reside in it the capital of the municipality, to focus on the same most of the administrative services and for being home to the most population despite being the smallest in size . However, as already noted, the history of this place goes back nearly 200 years ago.

The first inhabitants of this parish were from nearby, especially Valeixe . Began to populate the area, specifically the area known today as A Calzada, to serve better and more closely the cultivation of their lands . For the first inhabitants would follow others because were increasingly neighbors who wanted to stay close to their property and their fields and they began to build their own rooms, which followed best buildings. The name " Cañizas " that was given to the parish, which was faithfully explains their origin. The area began to fill with a few booths or huts made of woven tree branches and covered with straw to which the people of the country were called Cañizas and hurdles, so that the farmers could shelter from the rain . They were also known then the hurdles with the name of granaries .

Later also would begin construction of the so-called Royal Road of the cities of Tuy and Vigo for Castile, a work that would give the final impetus to this parish . The choice of route for these lands had much to do with good soil conditions. In this case Valeixe was relegated for having a more complicated orographic structure design of the roadway. For this voyage were raising numerous buildings . It was known as Main Street and also had a Coaching Inn for horse trough in the place we now know as Source of the Two Pipes.

At first, the place of A Cañiza belonged to the parish of St ª. Valeixe Cristina, who Valeixe City Council, as tends to be confused even today . But on 9 July 1790, the Bishop of Tuy, Fernández Angulo D.Domingo become the neighborhood " the Canizas " in Santa Cristina annexed so repeatedly request the locals of this neighborhood because, among other reasons, to the great distance that had to travel daily to the parish church . The church was located in Valeixe, or what is the same at 9 kilometers by a bad and " rocky " road. Shortly thereafter begin to build a chapel on the ground now occupied by the Plaza Mayor of the town, dedicated to the Holy Name of Jesus and St ª. Teresa . The July 28, 1790, would mark the first baptism and first marriage on September 5, also of the same year . But funerals are still held in Valeixe until full breakup occurred .

The population of the town grew increasingly more and wishing their neighbors separated entirely from the matrix and ask autonomy before the ordinary ecclesiastical parish of Tuy, did so in a contested trial, winning in a close case. They got the judgment on 25 February 1815. Due to political changes so significant that the country was living, A Cañiza had several cures treasurers and would have to wait until April or May 1844 to have its first abbot pastor named Dan. Benito Maria Sarmiento .

It will be in the late eighteenth and early nineteenth centuries when A Cañiza reach its peak . At this time it will increase your neighborhood a disproportionate, moved there Achas Justice for his hearing and became head Jurisdiction and party capital, taking the name has since Villa. In 1815 the town was governed by a regular judge your audience . Until 1820 A Cañiza not constitute City Hall with Mayor corresponding therefore to date and was ruled by Judge.

Prehistory 

One of the oldest remains of the town is the ' Citania ', located in Bouzas Chan . In this town built during the prehistoric period we see the remains of the ' Casarellas ' circular floor . In the same place we highlight a dolmen with a piece domed cover . Also in the same area we try to decipher the cave petroglyphs .

Antiquity 
The earliest known writings which mentions this area date back to the year 138 . C., when Livy says Decius issuing these lands Gross Juno.

Modern age 
During the War of Independence, the people of A Cañiza highlighted by binding and resistance to the French troops.

References

Caniza, A